Dumisa is a 24-hour digital satellite television African Christianity channel produced by Urban Brew Studios for DStv. This is Urban Brew's second religious channel, the first being One Gospel. Unlike its sister channel, this channel focuses on African indigenous Christianity values, Zion and Clap n Tap music, lifestyle and culture, and praise and worship.

References 

Christian television stations
Television stations in South Africa